Richard Rawson (born 5 February 1987), better known by his stage name Fazer, is a British rapper, singer, songwriter, record producer and DJ. He is popularly known as the member of hip hop trio N-Dubz releasing three studio albums and winning four MOBO awards with the group. Rawson has said that whilst growing up his biggest influences were Tupac Shakur, Biggie, Rakim, T.I., and Jay-Z.

Early life
Fazer is the son of an English father and Jamaican mother, and was brought up in Camden Town, London.  Fazer first met Dappy when they started attending the same karate class, becoming best friends at school.  They attended Haverstock School, with third member Tulisa Contostavlos (Dappy's cousin) attending the school for a while as well.  It was at school that the trio became close friends and formed N-Dubz.

Career

Fazer is a member of hip hop trio N-Dubz, from the age of 11. N-Dubz is known as one of the first breakthrough acts for UK Urban Music. They released three platinum-selling studio albums and won five MOBO awards. N-Dubz released their first album, Uncle B, in 2008, followed by Against All Odds in 2009, and Love.Live.Life in 2010. In 2011 the band announced a hiatus to focus on solo projects, after a hugely successful UK Arena Tour and a compilation album Greatest Hits.
The group have said on many occasions that they will reunite. In May 2022 the group officially reformed announcing a UK arena tour.

On 3 March 2012, Fazer was featured on BBC1's show Urban Classics where he performed his version of Englishman in New York originally by Sting and he also performed a tribute to Whitney Houston with Skepta.
About two weeks later, Fazer remixe "Somebody That I Used to Know" by Gotye 
Fazer shot a video for his debut single "Killer" on 29 May 2012, released on 26 August 2012.

In 2013, Fazer and his production partner, Peter Ibsen, both announced the opening of their production company, Sky's The Limit Entertainment (STL).
Fazer released a track '6-foot 8 (freestyle)' under the new company's name. The pair produced songs for Fazer himself and other artists such as Tulisa, Rihanna, Rita Ora and Jessie J .

On 12 July 2013, Fazer headlined the Yahoo! stage at the Yahoo! Wireless Festival, and performed songs such as Killer, Fireflies, Planetary and an N-Dubz medley. On 10 August 2013, Fazer performed at the BBC Urban Classics Prom alongside Wretch 32. He performed Fireflies and Movie. On 5 February 2014, he announced that he would now be releasing music under his real name Richard Rawson. In July 2014, Richard Rawson released his single 'Fireflies' which features vocals by Tom Parker of The Wanted. On the track Fazer raps about his journey so far in music. The song is about hope and achieving dreams. On 24 March 2017 'Fazer' released a song 'I Woke Up'.

Personal life
Rawson had a crush on Tulisa in school, until he realised that she was Dappy's cousin. The pair were in a relationship from mid-2010 until February 2012, when they broke up during a holiday together, after they fell apart.

In January 2013, it was announced he was dating model Ashley Emma, and that she was six months pregnant. On 20 February 2013 their daughter Ava Rose Rawson was born.

On 19 February 2023, Rawson revealed on his Instagram, that his partner had given birth to twins.

Discography

Singles

As Solo artist

Discography of production & Co-writes by Fazer

2012

Tulisa - The Female Boss
02. "Young"
04. "Damn"
06. "Live Your Life"
07. "Visa"

Rihanna - Unapologetic album recording sessions
01. "song title unknown"

2013

Jessie J - Alive
16. "Magnetic"

Rita Ora - Recording Sessions
01. "song title Unknown"

2014

Tulisa - Non-album Single
01. "Living Without You"

2016

BTS - Wings
10. "Lost"

Music Videos

References

1987 births
Living people
Black British male rappers
English male rappers
English people of Jamaican descent
People from Camden Town
Rappers from London